Josh Miller (born April 14, 1970) is a former American football punter and former football analyst.

He played college football at the University of Arizona, and was a First-team All-American in 1992.  He was signed by the Baltimore Stallions of the Canadian Football League (CFL) as an undrafted free agent in 1994. Miller was also a member of the Seattle Seahawks, Pittsburgh Steelers, New England Patriots and Tennessee Titans of the National Football League (NFL), and played in 168 games in his NFL career.

Early years
Miller, who is Jewish, attended East Brunswick High School and East Brunswick Jewish Center (EBJC) in East Brunswick, New Jersey. In East Brunswick High School he was an All-State pick in football (playing wide receiver, in addition to handling the duties of punting where he still holds some career records) and track (as a high jumper), as well as playing guard in basketball.

Miller was a high school classmate and football teammate of The Young Turks founder and CEO, Cenk Uygur.

College career

Scottsdale Community College
Miller attended Scottsdale Community College for two years and was a letterman in football with the Fighting Artichokes.  He was a two-time All-Western States Football League pick at punter.

Arizona
Miller transferred to the University of Arizona and was a two-year letterman in football.  He was an All-Pacific-10 Conference selection and an All-America selection as a senior.

Professional career

Baltimore Stallions
After graduating from Arizona, Miller signed in 1994 playing for the Baltimore Stallions of the Canadian Football League (recommended by Rich Ellerson, his former Arizona coach who once was a CFL staffer) and was a member of the 1995 Grey Cup champion team. Miller recorded a "single" in the 83rd Grey Cup when a punt, aided by a 50-km/h wind at Taylor Field in Regina, Saskatchewan bounded over the head of a Calgary Stampeders return man and out the back of the end zone to award Baltimore a single point.

Seattle Seahawks
Miller spent the preseason with the Seattle Seahawks before being released in the fall of the 1996 season.

Pittsburgh Steelers
In 1996 Miller joined the Pittsburgh Steelers. He stayed with the team through 2003, and continues to make his home in Pittsburgh.

In a 2003 game against the Baltimore Ravens, Miller completed an 81-yard touchdown pass to Steelers' teammate Chris Hope.  This tied a record held by Gary Hammond and Arthur Marshall for the longest pass completion by a non-quarterback in NFL history.

New England Patriots
Before the 2004 season Miller signed with the Patriots, with whom he played during the 2004, 2005, and 2006 seasons.

In Super Bowl XXXIX, Miller had two notable punts, one to the Eagles' 7-yard line and another that pinned the Eagles back at their own 4-yard line with just 46 seconds left in the game.

In his career with the Patriots, Miller played in 42 straight regular season games, before being placed on injured reserve on November 24, 2006. Miller was released on August 16, 2007.

Tennessee Titans
On September 21, 2007, Miller signed with the Tennessee Titans due to injuries to Craig Hentrich, and made his debut against New Orleans Saints on September 24, 2007. On December 17, 2007, the Titans released him. He was later re-signed by the Titans on May 23, 2008 only to be released again on August 19, 2008.

The Titans re-signed Miller four games into the 2008 regular season on October 4, 2008. The team released quarterback Chris Simms to make room for Miller on the roster, but two days later Miller was released again as Simms was re-signed.

Post-NFL career
Miller joined  KDKA-FM in Pittsburgh as an analyst on July 13, 2010 and also provides commentary for its sister television station KDKA-TV. He co-hosted The Fan Morning Show with Colin Dunlap and Jim Colony until April 2018. Miller is the president and co-founder of GELSPORT. As part of GELSPORT, Miller and Silver created a line of weighted training aids for hockey, lacrosse, and golf.

See also
List of select Jewish football players

References

External links
New England Patriots bio
Bardownski Hockey
GELSTX

1970 births
American football punters
Arizona Wildcats football players
Baltimore Stallions players
Canadian football punters
Canadian football placekickers
East Brunswick High School alumni
Jewish American sportspeople
Living people
New England Patriots players
People from East Brunswick, New Jersey
Pittsburgh Steelers players
Players of American football from New Jersey
Scottsdale Fighting Artichokes football players
Scottsdale Community College alumni
Seattle Seahawks players
Sportspeople from Queens, New York
Players of American football from New York City
Sportspeople from Middlesex County, New Jersey
Tennessee Titans players
University of Arizona alumni
21st-century American Jews